Friðþjófur (variations: Fritiof, Frithiof, Fritjof, Frithjof, and Fridtjof) is a Scandinavian masculine given name derived from Old Norse  friðr (“peace”) + þjófr (“thief”). Maybe a kenning (a metaphorical phrase used in Old Norse poetry) for a fighter. Bearers of the name include:

Iceland
The hero of Frithiof's Saga, an Icelandic saga finalized around 1300

Norway
 Frithjof M. Plahte (1836–1899), Norwegian merchant and landowner
 Frithjof Prydz (1841–1935), Norwegian judge
 Carl Frithjof Smith (1859–1917), Norwegian-German painter
 Fridtjof Nansen (1861–1930), Norwegian explorer
Fridtjof Nansen (disambiguation), things named in his honor
 Fritjof Heyerdahl (1879–1970), Norwegian engineer and industrial leader
 Frithjof Olsen (1882–1922), Norwegian gymnast
 Fridtjof Backer-Grøndahl (1885–1959), Norwegian pianist and composer
 Frithjof Olstad (1890–1956), Norwegian rower
 Frithjof Sælen (gymnast) (1892–1975), Norwegian gymnast
 Frithjof Andersen (1893–1975), Norwegian wrestler
 Fridtjof Knutsen (1894–1961), Norwegian journalist and crime novelist
 Fridtjof Paulsen (1895–1988), Norwegian speed skater
 Frithjof Lorentzen (1896–1965), Norwegian fencer
 Fridtjof Mjøen (1897–1967), Norwegian actor
 Carl Fridtjof Rode (1897–1984), Norwegian judge
 Frithjof Ulleberg (1911–1993), Norwegian footballer
 Frithjof Jacobsen (1914–1999), Norwegian diplomat
 Frithjof Tidemand-Johannessen (1916–1958), Norwegian designer and writer
 Frithjof Clausen (1916–1998), Norwegian wrestler
 Frithjof Sælen (writer) (1917–2004), Norwegian writer
 Fridtjof Frank Gundersen (born 1934), Norwegian jurist
 Leif Fritjof Måsvær (born 1941), Norwegian politician
 Frithjof Prydz (athlete) (1943–1992), Norwegian ski jumper and tennis player
 Fridtjof Røinås (born 1994), Norwegian racing cyclist
 Fridtjof Støre, singer for Norwegian band Albino Superstars (formed in 2004)

Sweden
 Frithiof Holmgren (1831–1897), Swedish physician and physiologist
 Frithiof Mårtensson (1884–1956), Swedish wrestler
 Fritiof Domö (1889–1961), Swedish landlord and politician
 Fritiof Karlsson (1892–1984), Swedish politician
 Fritiof Nilsson Piraten (1895–1972), Swedish author
 Fritiof Svensson (1896–1961), Swedish wrestler
 Elof Fritjof Hillén (1893–1977), Swedish soccer player
 Frithiof Rudén, Swedish footballer
 Fritiof Billquist (1901–1972), Swedish film actor
 Fritjof Lager (1905–1973), Swedish politician
 Fritiof S. Sjöstrand (1912–2011), Swedish physician and histologist
 Fritiof Enbom (1918–1974), Swedish railway worker
 Fritiof Andersson, title character of "Fritiof och Carmencita", a 1937 Swedish song written by Evert Taube
 Fritiof Björkén (born 1991), Swedish footballer

Denmark
 Fritiof Andersen (1898–1954), Danish track and field athlete

Finland
 Frithiof Nevanlinna (1894–1977), Finnish mathematician

Germany
 SMS Frithjof (laid down 1890), German coastal defense ship
 Frithjof Henckel (born 1950), German rower
 Frithjof Schmidt (born 1953), German politician for the Greens
 Frithjof Kleen (born 1983), German sailor
 Frithjof Seidel (born 1997), German diver

Switzerland
 Frithjof Schuon (1907–1998), Swiss metaphysician

United States
Norwegian descent
 Karl Fritjof Rolvaag (1913–1990), American politician

Swedish descent
 Fritiof Fryxell (1900–1986), American geologist and mountain climber

Austrian descent
 Frithjof Bergmann (1930–2021), German-American philosopher
 Fritjof Capra (born 1939), American physicist, ecologist, and systems theorist

Antarctica
Fridtjof Island, lying in the Palmer Archipelago

See also
Friedhof (disambiguation)

Norwegian masculine given names
Swedish masculine given names